Helix cincta is a species of gastropods belonging to the family Helicidae.

The species is found in Southern Europe.

References

Helicidae
Gastropods described in 1774